Jeotgalibacillus is a Gram-positive bacterial genus from the family Planococcaceae.

References

Further reading 
 
 
 
 

Bacillales
Bacteria genera